Danalu (also Romanized as Dānālū; also known as Denelau) is a village in Dizajrud-e Gharbi Rural District, in the Central District of Ajab Shir County, East Azerbaijan Province, Iran. At the 2006 census, its population was 521, in 137 families.

References 

Populated places in Ajab Shir County